Christiane Rücker (born 1944) is a German film and television actress.

Selected filmography
 Holiday in St. Tropez (1964)
 How to Seduce a Playboy (1966)
 The Blood Demon (1967)
 Carmen, Baby (1967)
 Take Off Your Clothes, Doll (1968)
 The Doctor of St. Pauli (1968)
 Frankenstein's Castle of Freaks (1974)
 The Unicorn (1978)
 Kottan ermittelt (1978–1983, TV series)

References

Bibliography 
 Christina Gerhardt & Marco Abel. Celluloid Revolt: German Screen Cultures and the Long 1968. Boydell & Brewer, 2019.

External links 
 

1944 births
Living people
German film actresses
German television actresses
People from Silesia